Yeremeyevo is a rural locality (a village) in Teplogorskoye Rural Settlement, Velikoustyugsky District, Vologda Oblast, Russia. The population was 71 as of 2002.

Geography 
Yeremeyevo is located 60 km southeast of Veliky Ustyug (the district's administrative centre) by road. Olkhovka is the nearest rural locality.

References 

Rural localities in Velikoustyugsky District